Margarita Victoria "Mavi" García Cañellas (born 2 January 1984) is a Spanish professional racing cyclist and duathlete, who currently rides for UCI Women's WorldTeam .

Major results

2015
 1st Zalla
 2nd Sopelana
 3rd Overall Gipuzkoako Emakumeen Itzulia
 4th Larrabasterra
2016
 National Road Championships
1st  Road race
3rd Time trial
 1st  Overall Vuelta a Burgos
1st Stage 1
 1st Gran Premio Comunidad de Cantabria
 1st Trofeo Gobierno de La Rioja
 1st Trofeo Ria de Marin
 1st Zizurkil-Villabona Sari Nagusia
 2nd 94.7 Cycle Challenge
 KZN Summer Series
2nd Queen Nandi Challenge
8th Queen Sibiya Classic
 6th Overall Tour Cycliste Féminin International de l'Ardèche
2017
 1st Trofeo Gobierno de La Rioja
 National Road Championships
2nd Time trial
2nd Road race
 2nd Gran Premio Ciudad de Alcobendas
 2nd Gran Premio Costa Blanca Calpe
 3rd Gran Premio Comunidad de Cantabria
 5th Overall Tour Cycliste Féminin International de l'Ardèche
 5th Trofeo Roldan
 7th Emakumeen Aiztondo Sari Nagusia
 7th Trofeo Ciudad de Caspe
 9th Durango-Durango Emakumeen Saria
2018
 National Road Championships
1st  Time trial
3rd Road race
 1st Gran Premio Comunidad de Cantabria
 2nd Overall Tour Cycliste Féminin International de l'Ardèche
 6th Overall Setmana Ciclista Valenciana
 8th Ladies Tour of Norway TTT
 9th Open de Suède Vårgårda TTT
 10th La Flèche Wallonne
2019
 2nd Overall Women's Tour de Yorkshire
1st  Mountains Classification
 2nd Grand Prix de Plumelec-Morbihan Dames
 3rd Overall Vuelta a Burgos Feminas
 5th Overall Emakumeen Euskal Bira
 6th Overall Tour Cycliste Féminin International de l'Ardèche
 10th La Flèche Wallonne
 10th Mixed team relay, UCI Road World Championships
2020
 National Road Championships
1st  Road race
1st  Time trial
 2nd Strade Bianche
 2nd Overall Tour Cycliste Féminin International de l'Ardèche
1st Stages 1 & 2
 2nd Emakumeen Nafarroako Klasikoa
 2nd Durango-Durango Emakumeen Saria
 9th Overall Giro Rosa
 9th Brabantse Pijl
2021
 National Road Championships
1st  Time trial
1st  Road race
 1st Giro dell'Emilia Internazionale Donne Elite
 2nd Overall Setmana Ciclista Valenciana
 2nd Overall Tour Cycliste Féminin International de l'Ardèche
 5th La Flèche Wallonne
 6th Trofeo Alfredo Binda
 6th Amstel Gold Race
2022
 National Road Championships
1st  Time trial
1st  Road race
 1st  GP de Plouay
 1st Stage 3 Vuelta a Burgos Feminas
 5th La Flèche Wallonne
 6th Amstel Gold Race
 9th Overall Setmana Ciclista Valenciana 
 3rd Overall 2022 Giro d'Italia Donne
 10th Overall Tour de France
 Combativity award Stage 8

See also
 List of 2021 UCI Women's Teams and riders

References

External links
 

1984 births
Living people
Spanish female cyclists
Sportspeople from Mallorca
Olympic cyclists of Spain
Cyclists at the 2020 Summer Olympics
Cyclists from the Balearic Islands
20th-century Spanish women
21st-century Spanish women